The 2012 Billboard Music Awards is a music award ceremony that was held on May 20, 2012 at the MGM Grand Garden Arena in Las Vegas, Nevada. It aired live on ABC at 8:00/7:00 PM central. The show was hosted by Modern Familys Julie Bowen and Ty Burrell.

The awards recognized the most popular artists and albums from 2011.

Performances

Notes
 - Midway through the performance, ABC cut to commercial.

Presenters
Julianne Hough – Presented the Top Social Artist Award
Lisa Marie Presley – Presented the Spotlight Award
Robin Thicke – Introduced Kelly Clarkson
Miley Cyrus – Presented the Top New Artist Award
Brandy – Introduced Chris Brown
Natasha Bedingfield – Gave short monologue and tribute to Donna Summer
Kris Kristofferson – Gave speech to highlight accomplishments of Taylor Swift
Zooey Deschanel – Presented Woman of the Year Award
Far East Movement  – Introduced Usher
Jason Derülo – Presented Hot 100 Song of the Year
Wiz Khalifa – Presented Top Duo/Group
Luke Bryan – Introduced Carrie Underwood
Gladys Knight – Presented Male Artist of the Year
Swizz Beatz – Introduced Linkin Park
Monica and Eric Benet – Presented R&B Artist of the Year
Whoopi Goldberg – Introduced Whitney Houston tribute
Bobbi Kristina Brown and Pat Houston – Accepted Millennium Award
Taio Cruz – Introduced Patent Pending
Gavin DeGraw – Introduced Nelly Furtado
Alicia Keys – Presented Icon Award

Winners and nominees
Winners are listed in bold.

Artists with multiple wins and nominations

References

External links

2012
Billboard awards
2012 in American music
2012 in Nevada
2012 music awards
MGM Grand Garden Arena